Cliff Muntu (8 June 1987 Manado, North Sulawesi - 3 April 2007 Sumedang, West Java) was a sophomore student of IPDN, who died as a result of being beaten by his seniors during hazing. He was a member of the North Sulawesi contingent. His death has invoked critics from the public as the Institute has allowed seniority in the form of violence towards the junior students to happen under the pretext of discipline.

An autopsy and investigation found Muntu had bruises on several of his organs from a beating by five senior students. Four have since been expelled.

The case has attracted nationwide attention of the Indonesian media as well as high-level officials in the Indonesian government, particularly because this is the 35th death in the school since 1993, as revealed by the whistleblower: a suspended IPDN professor Inu Kencana. President Susilo Bambang Yudhoyono has appealed to totally demilitarise the school in order to break the cycle of violence.

References

1987 births
2007 deaths
People from Manado
Deaths by beating